Kia Joy Goodwin is an American actress. She is best known for her childhood role as Tiffany Holloway, Rose Holloway's daughter on the NBC comedy sitcom 227 for two seasons (1985–1987).

Career
Goodwin made her first television appearance commercially in 1976 for such products as M&M's, Jello Pudding, and AT&T. In 1981, she joined the First National Touring Company of Annie, where she played the role of Duffy. After the tour closed in 1982, she went on to join the final Broadway cast of Annie playing the roles of Tessie and then Kate. At the same time, she went on to work on an ABC Afterschool Special in 1981, then appeared in 1984's Growing Up on Broadway.

In the spring of 1985, Goodwin was cast as Tiffany Holloway on the NBC sitcom 227 as a series regular during the show's first season. Goodwin's mother was unhappy in California and wanted to move back to New York, so she was let out of her contract and written out of the series after the second season, where Goodwin was now a recurring guest star. She reprised the role for the final time in a season three episode ("The Sing-Off").

She appeared in the 1993 HBO movie, Strapped as Latisha Jordan. In 1998 she appeared on Broadway again in Paul Simon's musical "The Capeman". Later that year she co-starred opposite Jennifer Aniston in the 1998 film, The Object of My Affection; two years later, she appeared as a Young Nurse in the 2000 movie, The Opportunists. She has also guest starred on television shows such as Jake In Progress, Platinum, Barbershop, Law & Order: Special Victims Unit and Law & Order.

Filmography

Film

Television

References

External links

Living people
People from Montclair, New Jersey
African-American actresses
Actresses from New Jersey
American child actresses
American stage actresses
American television actresses
American film actresses
20th-century American actresses
21st-century American actresses
20th-century African-American women
20th-century African-American people
21st-century African-American women
21st-century African-American people
Year of birth missing (living people)